Ramadani Baki (born 1943) was Chief Minister of Zanzibar from 21 February 1983 to 6 February 1984.

References 

1943 births
Living people
Tanzanian Muslims
Chief Ministers of Zanzibar